Ferdinand Joachimsthal was a German mathematician.

He was born on March 9, 1818, at Goldberg (Złotoryja), Silesia and died on April 5, 1861, at Breslau (Wrocław). In the year of his graduation (Ph.D., Berlin, 1842) he was appointed teacher at a Realschule in Berlin, and in 1846 was admitted to the philosophical faculty of the university as privatdozent. In 1856, he was appointed professor of mathematics at Halle, and in 1858 at Breslau.

Joachimsthal, who was Jewish, contributed essays to Crelle's Journal, 1846, 1850, 1854, 1861, and to Torquem's Nouvelles Annales des Mathématiques.

He is known for Joachimsthal's Equation and Joachimsthal Notation , both associated with conic sections.

References

People from the Province of Silesia
19th-century German mathematicians
Silesian Jews
1818 births
1861 deaths